Luis Carbonell Artajona (born 27 April 2003) is a Spanish footballer who plays as a forward for CD Teruel, on loan from Real Zaragoza.

Club career
Born in Zaragoza, Aragon, Carbonell was a Real Zaragoza youth graduate. In 2018, he agreed to a professional contract with the club until 2023.

Carbonell made his senior debut with the reserves at the age of 17 on 18 July 2020, coming on as a second-half substitute for Marcos Baselga in a 0–1 Tercera División away loss against SD Tarazona, in the promotion play-offs. He scored his first senior goal on 18 October, netting the equalizer in a 1–1 away draw against CF Illueca.

Carbonell made his first team debut on 9 December 2020, replacing Pep Chavarría late into a 0–1 loss at UD Almería in the Segunda División. The following 31 August, he was loaned to Real Madrid and returned to the youth setup.

On 21 August 2022, Carbonell moved to Segunda Federación side CD Teruel on loan for one year.

References

External links

2003 births
Living people
Spanish footballers
Footballers from Zaragoza
Association football forwards
Segunda División players
Segunda Federación players
Tercera División players
Real Zaragoza B players
Real Zaragoza players
CD Teruel footballers
Spain youth international footballers